Mălăiești is a commune in Orhei District, Moldova. It is composed of two villages, Mălăiești and Tîrzieni.

References

Communes of Orhei District